The Kharkiv Theoretical Physics School was founded by Lev Landau  in Kharkov, Soviet Union  (now Kharkiv, Ukraine). It is sometimes referred to as the Landau school — more precisely, one might say that Landau's group at Kharkiv was the beginning of the Landau school that, after Landau moved to the Kapitza’ Institute for Physical Problems in Moscow, included new generations of theoretical physicists from the countries of the former Soviet Union. Lev Landau was the head of the Kharkhiv Theoretical Physics School from 1932 to 1937, when he left for Moscow. His students at Kharkiv included Alexander Akhiezer, Evgeny Lifshitz, Ilya Lifshitz, and Isaak Pomeranchuk. Upon the recommendation of Edward Teller, László Tisza joined, in January 1935, Landau's group at Kharkiv and then returned to Budapest in 1937 after Landau's departure to Moscow.

Landau developed a comprehensive exam called the "Theoretical Minimum" which students were expected to pass before admission to the school. The exam covered all aspects of theoretical physics, and between 1934–1937 in Kharkiv and 1937–1961 in Moscow only 43 candidates passed. In this way his students became proper physicists, rather than narrow specialists.

In Kharkiv, he and his friend and former student, Evgeny Lifshitz, began writing the Course of Theoretical Physics, ten volumes that together span the whole of the subject and are still widely used as graduate-level physics texts.

Selected scientists associated with the school
 Lev Landau
 Ilya Mikhailovich Lifshitz
 Evgeny Lifshitz

References 

Education in Kharkiv